The Formby Hall Challenge was a golf tournament on the Challenge Tour that was played annually from 1996 to 2002. It was also an event on the third-tier MasterCard Tour.

With the merger of the MasterCard and Europro tours to form the PGA EuroPro Tour in 2003, the tournament was dropped from the Challenge Tour schedule. Formby Hall, host venue between 1999 and 2002, continued to host an event on the new tour.

Winners

References

External links
Coverage on the Challenge Tour's official site

Former Challenge Tour events
Golf tournaments in England